Viplove Thakur (born 4 October 1943) is an Indian politician. A senior leader of the Indian National Congress party, she has been a member of the Parliament of India. Thakur has represented Himachal Pradesh in the Rajya Sabha, the upper house of the Parliament since April, 2006. She retired from the Upper House in April, 2020.

Family 
She comes from a freedom fighter family of Himachal Pradesh. Her father late Sh. Paras Ram was a freedom fighter from Himachal Pradesh and a leader of the Communist Party of India. Her mother late Smt. Sarla Sharma was also a prominent leader of the Indian National Congress.

Positions held 

 1985–90, 1993–98 and 1998-2003 	 Member, Himachal Pradesh Legislative Assembly.
 1995-98 	 Minister of State (Independent charge), Indian System of Medicines, Government of Himachal Pradesh.
 Aug. 2003 - March 2006 	 Chairperson, State Commission for Women, Himachal Pradesh.
 April 2006 	 Elected to Rajya Sabha.
 June 2006 - Nov. 2006 	 Member, Committee on Science and Technology, Environment and Forests.
 Aug. 2006 - July 2008 	 President, Himachal Pradesh Congress Committee.
 Aug. 2006 - May 2009 	 Member, Committee on Defence.
 Nov. 2006 - May 2009 & Aug. 2009 - April 2012 	 Member, Committee on Health and Family Welfare.
 July 2007 - May 2009 	 Member, India-U.S.A. Parliamentary Friendship Group.
 Aug. 2007 - April 2012 	 Member, Post-Graduate Institute of Medical Education and Research (PGIMER), Chandigarh.
 May 2008 - Sept. 2009 	 Member, Committee on Government Assurances. 
 May 2008 - May 2009 	 Member, Consultative Committee for the Ministry of Women and Child Development. 
 Aug. 2008 - May 2009 	 Member, Hindi Salahkar Samiti of the Ministry of Commerce and Industry. 
 Sept. 2009 - May 2010 	 Member, Committee on Petitions.
 Sept. 2009 - April 2012 	 Member, Consultative Committee for the Ministry of Road Transport and Highways.
 March 2010 - April 2012 	 Member, Agricultural and Processed Food Products Export Development Authority (APEDA).
 December 2010 - April 2012 	 Member, Central Advisory Committee for the National Cadet Corps. 
 Jan. 2010 - April 2012 	 Member, Hindi Salahkar Samiti of the Ministry of Health and Family Welfare. 
 May 2011 - April 2012 	 Member, Sub-Committee-I to examine the functioning of AIIMS of the Committee of Health and Family Welfare.
 April 2014 	 Elected to Rajya Sabha (Second term).

References

Indian National Congress politicians from Himachal Pradesh
Rajya Sabha members from Himachal Pradesh
Living people
Women in Himachal Pradesh politics
21st-century Indian women politicians
21st-century Indian politicians
1943 births
Women members of the Rajya Sabha